Khandgaon, is a small village in Sangamner Taluka in Ahmednagar District of Maharashtra State, India. It belongs to Khandesh and Northern Maharashtra region. It belongs to Nashik Division. It is located 87 km towards west from District headquarters Ahmednagar, 3 km from Sangamner, 176 km from State capital Mumbai.

References 

Villages in Ahmednagar district